Mile End Lock is a lock on the Regent's Canal, in Mile End, in the London Borough of Tower Hamlets. The lock spans the Regent's Canal between Queen Mary University of London and Mile End Park, and the canal path goes under Mile End Bridge. There is a 19th-century lock keeper's cottage.

The nearest London Underground station is Mile End.

See also

Canals of the United Kingdom
History of the British canal system

References

Locks on the Regent's Canal
Geography of the London Borough of Tower Hamlets
Buildings and structures in the London Borough of Tower Hamlets
Mile End
Queen Mary University of London